Claude Gatignol (born November 20, 1938 in Saint-Julien-près-Bort) is a member of the National Assembly of France.  He represents the Manche department,  and is a member of the Union for a Popular Movement.

References

1938 births
Living people
People from Corrèze
Independent Republicans politicians
Liberal Democracy (France) politicians
Union for French Democracy politicians
Union for a Popular Movement politicians
French military personnel of the Algerian War
Deputies of the 12th National Assembly of the French Fifth Republic
Deputies of the 13th National Assembly of the French Fifth Republic
Members of Parliament for Manche